Griffith Lloyd Owen (1902–1949) was an English footballer who played as a centre forward for Hull City and Rochdale. His career began at Liverpool with their reserve team.

References

Rochdale A.F.C. players
Hull City A.F.C. players
Chester City F.C. players
Flint Town United F.C. players
Liverpool F.C. players
Footballers from Liverpool
English footballers
1902 births
1949 deaths
Association footballers not categorized by position